is a Japanese track and field sprinter. He was an unused reserve runner in the 4 × 100 metres relay at the 2011 World Championships. He has won several medals at regional level.

His personal best is 10.22 seconds in the 100 metres and 20.56 seconds in the 200 metres. He is also the former national best holder for the outdoor 60 metres at 6.63 seconds.

Personal bests

International competition

National titles

References

External links

Sota Kawatsura at JAAF 
Sota Kawatsura at Mizuno Track Club 

1989 births
Living people
Japanese male sprinters
Athletes from Tokyo
World Athletics Championships athletes for Japan
Competitors at the 2011 Summer Universiade